"One Day" is a song by American rapper Logic. It was released on July 27, 2018, by Visionary Music Group and Def Jam Recordings, as the lead single from Logic's fourth studio album, YSIV. Produced by Logic, 6ix, and Kevin Randolph, the song features guest vocals from singer-songwriter Ryan Tedder. The writing credits are shared between both the artists and the producers. "One Day" peaked at number 80 on the US Billboard Hot 100. He performed the song with Ryan Tedder at the 2018 MTV Video Music Awards.

Background 
The song was created in 20 minutes according to Logic in an interview with HardKnockTV, where he also explains why he released this as the first single for his then upcoming album:

It was the most positive. To me that is the quintessential ‘Young Sinatra,’ happy vibe, dope, I got those. There's a lot of fans who felt that vibe as well… If there's anything I want to represent this album, it would definitely be ["One Day"]

Music video 
The song's accompanying music video premiered on August 17, 2018, on Logic's Vevo channel on YouTube. The music video was, like the "1-800-273-8255" video, directed by Andy Hines. The main cast consisted of Luis Guzmán, Judy Reyes, Michael Peña, Ty Simpkins, and Madeline Brewer. The video depicts the life of a child who was separated from his family at the border between Mexico and the United States. He becomes a doctor and saves the life of a white supremacist.

Charts

References 

2018 singles
2018 songs
Logic (rapper) songs
Def Jam Recordings singles
Pop ballads
Songs written by Ryan Tedder
2010s ballads
Songs written by 6ix (record producer)
Songs written by Logic (rapper)